The Union of South Africa competed at the 1948 Summer Olympics in London, England. 35 competitors, 34 men and 1 woman, took part in 34 events in 10 sports.

Medalists

Gold
 Gerald Dreyer — Boxing, Men's Lightweight
 George Hunter — Boxing, Men's Light Heavyweight

Silver
 Dennis Shepherd — Boxing, Men's Featherweight

Bronze
 John Arthur — Boxing, Men's Heavyweight

Athletics

Boxing

Cycling

Three cyclists, all men, represented South Africa in 1948.

Individual road race
 Dirkie Binneman
 George Estman
 Wally Rivers

Team road race
 Dirkie Binneman
 George Estman
 Wally Rivers

Diving

Rowing

South Africa had five male rowers participate in two out of seven rowing events in 1948.

 Men's single sculls
 Ian Stephen

 Men's coxless four
 Edgar Ramsay
 Austin Ikin
 Des Maybery
 Claude Kietzman

Sailing

Swimming

Weightlifting

Wrestling

Art competitions

References

External links
Official Olympic Reports
International Olympic Committee results database

Nations at the 1948 Summer Olympics
1948
1948 in South African sport